Albert Hopoate (born 25 February 2001) is an Australian professional rugby league footballer who plays as a  and  for the Canberra Raiders in the NRL. 

He previously played for the Manly Warringah Sea Eagles in the National Rugby League.

Background
Hopoate is of Tongan descent through his father John Hopoate who was an Australian, Tongan and New South Wales State of Origin representative. His elder brothers William Hopoate and Jamil Hopoate also play rugby league professionally, for St. Helens and Brisbane Broncos respectively. 

Albert played his junior rugby league for the Beacon Hill Bears, before being signed by the Manly Warringah Sea Eagles.

Playing career

Early years
Hopoate rose through the grades at the Manly-Warringah club, playing for their Harold Matthews Cup and S. G. Ball Cup sides, also appearing for the New South Wales under-16s side in 2017. He also played for the Australian Schoolboys rugby union team, New South Wales National Youth rugby sevens and Australian World Schools rugby sevens teams in 2017.

2020
In August, Manly agreed to loan Hopoate to the New Zealand Warriors for four games. A week later, the deal was canceled after Manly required Hopoate due to an injury to centre Moses Suli. Hopoate made his NRL debut for Manly-Warringah in round 16 of the 2020 NRL season, a 6–30 loss to the Melbourne Storm.

In December, Hopoate signed a one-year contract with the Canberra Raiders starting in 2021.

2022
In round 18 against the Melbourne Storm Hopoate played his first game for the Raiders, and the following week against the New Zealand Warriors he scored his first try as a Canberra Raiders player.

References

External links
Canberra Raiders profile

2001 births
Living people
Australian sportspeople of Tongan descent
Australian rugby league players
Albert
Manly Warringah Sea Eagles players
Canberra Raiders players
Rugby league centres
Rugby league fullbacks
Rugby league players from Sydney
Rugby league wingers